France competed at the 1963 Mediterranean Games in Naples, Italy.

Medalists

Gold
Claude Piquemal — Athletics, 100 metres
Michel Hiblot — Athletics, 400 metres
Jean Wadoux — Athletics, 1500 metres
Michel Chardles — Athletics, 110 metres hurdles
Eddy van Praagh, Jean-Claude Leriche, Jean-Pierre Boccardo, Michel Hiblot — Athletics, 4 x 400 metres relay
Bernard Monnereau — Rowing, Single sculls
Bernard Monnereau, René Duhamel — Rowing, Double sculls
????? — Rowing, Coxed fours
????????? — Rowing, Eights
Christian Cuch — Cycling, Individual pursuit
Francis Bazire — Cycling, Individual road race
Jean-Claude Magnan — Fencing, Individual foil
Yves Dreyfus — Fencing, Individual épée
Georges Ballery — Wrestling, Freestyle 63 kg
Alain Gottvallès — Swimming, 100 metres freestyle
Francis Luyce — Swimming, 400 metres freestyle
Jean Pommat, Jean-Pascal Curtillet, Gérard Gropaiz, Francis Luyce, Alain Gottvallès (heats) — Swimming, 4 × 200 m freestyle relay

Silver
François Châtelet — Athletics, 800 metres
Jean Fayolle — Athletics, 5000 metres
Marcel Duriez — Athletics, 110 metres hurdles
Eddy Van Praagh — Athletics, 400 metres hurdles
Jean-Louis Brugier, Paul Genevay, Claude Piquemal, Jocelyn Delecour — Athletics, 4 x 100 metres relay
Roland Gras — Athletics, Pole vault
Jean Cochard — Athletics, Long jump
Guy Husson — Athletics, Hammer throw
Christian Monneret — Athletics, Javelin throw
???? — Rowing, Coxless fours
Bruno — Boxing, Light heavyweight 81 kg
Pierre Trentin — Cycling, 1000 metres time trial
?, Christian Cuch, Joseph Pare, Jacques Suire — Cycling, Team pursuit
?,? — Cycling, Tandem
??, Georges Chappe, Marcel-Ernest Bidault — Cycling, Team time trial 100 km
Jean Ramez — Fencing, Individual sabre
Claude Bourquard — Fencing, Individual épée
André Zoete — Wrestling, Freestyle 52 kg
René Schiermeyer — Wrestling, Freestyle 78 kg
Francis Luyce — Swimming, 1500 metres freestyle
Claude Raffy — Swimming, 200 metres backstroke
??, Jean Pommat, Robert Christophe, Alain Gottvallès — Swimming, 4 × 100 m medley relay
?, Roger Bourdon — Sailing, Star class
Francis Jammes — Sailing, Finn class

Bronze
Jean-Pierre Boccardo — Athletics, 4x100 metres Relay
Jean Pellez — Athletics, 800 metres
Robert Poirier — Athletics, 400 metres hurdles
Raymond Dugarreau — Athletics, High jump
Hervé d'Encausse — Athletics, Pole vault
Alain Lefèvre — Athletics, Long jump
Le Blois — Boxing, Welterweight 67 kg
Daniel Morelon — Cycling, Sprint
Lucien Aimar — Cycling, Road race
Jacky Courtillat — Fencing, Individual foil
Claude Arabo — Fencing, Individual sabre
Jean Guillou, Michel Bouchonnet, Bernard Fauqueux, Christian Guiffroy, Daniel Touche — Gymnastics, Team
Christian Guiffroy — Gymnastics, Horizontal bar
??? — Water polo

Athletics

Basketball

Football

Swimming

References

External links
Official report of the 1963 Mediterranean Games (Total medal tally does not include medals for athletics and rowing)

Nations at the 1963 Mediterranean Games
1963
Mediterranean Games